The Welsh Golf Classic was a men's professional golf tournament on the European Tour, that was held annually in Wales from 1979 to 1982. The inaugural event was held at Wenvoe Castle Golf Club near Cardiff, with the other three stagings taking place at Royal Porthcawl Golf Club in Mid Glamorgan.

The most notable winner was future two-time major championship winner Sandy Lyle.

In its final year, the prize fund was £50,000, which was one of the smaller purses on the tour that year.

Winners

External links
Coverage on the European Tour's official site

Former European Tour events
Golf tournaments in Wales
Recurring sporting events established in 1979
Recurring events disestablished in 1982
1979 establishments in Wales
1982 disestablishments in Wales
Defunct sports competitions in Wales